The Performance Management Division, Cabinet Secretariat was set up by the Government of India in January 2009. The Division was established with a view to assess the effectiveness of Government Departments in their mandated functions. Reporting to the Cabinet Secretary, Dr Prajapati Trivedi was made the first secretary, Performance Management with a mandate to roll out the PMES. In the year 2013 (fourth year of implementation) the system extends to 80 Departments/Ministries with around 800 responsibility centres (autonomous organizations / subordinate offices/ attached offices).

Background

In the Joint Session of Parliament held on 4 June 2009, the then President of India Pratibha Devisingh Patil had outlined 13 important measures to be initiated by the Government of India in the next hundred days. ‘’Establishing Mechanism for performance monitoring and performance evaluation in Government on a regular basis ‘’ was one of the measures to be initiated by the Government. This was followed by the approval of an outline of a Performance Monitoring and Evaluation System (PMES) for Government Departments by the Prime Minister on September 11, 2009.

Working
The PMES system was established with a view to assess the effectiveness of Government Departments in their mandated functions which involves the preparation of a Results Framework Document (RFD) by each Department every year, highlighting its objectives and priorities for the financial year against pre specified targets at the end of the year.

RFD(Results Framework Document)

A Results-Framework Document (RFD) is a PMES tool, documenting a record of understanding between a Minister representing the people's mandate, and the Secretary of a Department responsible for implementing this mandate.
In its fifth round of implementation, i.e. 2013, the division has made public five compendiums having RFDs of different Departments/Ministries
 RFD compendium 2013-14
 RFD compendium 2012-13
 RFD compendium 2011-12
 RFD compendium 2010-11
 RFD compendium 2009-10

See also 
 Cabinet Secretariat, Government of India

References

External links
 Performance Management Division(PMD),Cabinet Secretariat page
 Government of India Cabinet Secretariat page

Cabinet Secretariat of India
Government audit